The following television stations operate on virtual channel 10 in the United States:

 K02NV-D in Sargents, Colorado
 K03AY-D in Ridgway, etc., Colorado
 K04JZ-D in Gold Hill, Oregon
 K04MG-D in Wedderburn, etc., Oregon
 K04QX-D in Townsend, Montana
 K06HZ-D in Paonia, Colorado
 K06KA-D in Fort Jones, etc., California
 K06PG-D in Laughlin, Nevada
 K07GI-D in Prospect, Oregon
 K07OJ-D in Snowflake, Arizona
 K07YJ-D in Bullhead City, Arizona
 K08LG-D in Silver Lake, etc., Oregon
 K08PE-D in Alamo, etc., Nevada
 K08PG-D in Indian Springs, Nevada
 K09VC-D in Paisley, Oregon
 K10BA-D in Orondo, etc., Washington
 K10KG-D in Tenakee Springs, Alaska
 K10KH-D in Shageluk, Alaska
 K10KM-D in Cape Girardeau, Missouri
 K10LJ-D in Galena, Alaska
 K10LU-D in Nightmute, Alaska
 K10MZ-D in Dolores, Colorado
 K10NY-D in Ismay Canyon, Colorado
 K10OD-D in Weber Canyon, Colorado
 K10OG-D in Lompoc, California
 K10PM-D in Breckenridge, Colorado
 K10QL-D in Abilene, Texas
 K10QX-D in Reno, Nevada
 K12LS-D in Challis, Idaho
 K12MS-D in Elko, Nevada
 K12PT-D in Ryndon, Nevada
 K13ML-D in Hotchkiss, etc., Colorado
 K13NQ-D in Ruth, Nevada
 K13NR-D in Ely & McGill, Nevada
 K13QE-D in Driggs, Idaho
 K13QH-D in Swan Valley/Irwin, Idaho
 K14AL-D in Ely, Nevada
 K14IJ-D in Leadore, Idaho
 K14MC-D in Lava Hot Springs, Idaho
 K14QH-D in Butte Falls, Oregon
 K14TH-D in Williams, Oregon
 K15GO-D in Georgetown, Idaho
 K15HR-D in Mackay, Idaho
 K15HU-D in Lakeview, Oregon
 K15JZ-D in Applegate Valley, Oregon
 K15KE-D in Klamath Falls, etc., Oregon
 K15KL-D in Jacksonville, Oregon
 K15KN-D in Roseburg, Oregon
 K16BZ-D in Ruidoso, New Mexico
 K17BN-D in Needles, California
 K17GK-D in Arlington, Oregon
 K17II-D in Logan, Utah
 K17NS-D in Chloride, Arizona
 K18IZ-D in Grandfield, Oklahoma
 K18LJ-D in Dunsmuir, etc., California
 K18LU-D in Glendale, etc., Oregon
 K18MD-D in Childress, Texas
 K19BK-D in Lakeview, Oregon
 K19CY-D in Rockland, Idaho
 K19HH-D in Midland, etc., Oregon
 K19JW-D in Mauna Loa, Hawaii
 K20KT-D in Dora, New Mexico
 K20MQ-D in Rexburg, Idaho
 K21JI-D in Cave Junction, etc., Oregon
 K21NW-D in Tulia, Texas
 K22ND-D in Willmar, Minnesota
 K22NK-D in Lake Havasu City, Arizona
 K22NV-D in Malad City, Idaho
 K22OQ-D in Fort Jones, etc., California
 K23BV-D in Montpelier, Idaho
 K23DO-D in Malta, Idaho
 K23DX-D in Pitkin, Colorado
 K23FP-D in Olivia, Minnesota
 K23GK-D in Astoria, Oregon
 K24FH-D in Glide, etc., Oregon
 K24GE-D in Wells, Nevada
 K24MW-D in Clovis, New Mexico
 K25GM-D in Newport, Nebraska
 K25JW-D in Hugo, etc., Oregon
 K25LU-D in Mesquite, Nevada
 K25OM-D in Prescott, Arizona
 K25PO-D in Holbrook, Idaho
 K26FQ-D in John Day, Oregon
 K26HY-D in Ely, Nevada
 K26JR-D in Turkey, Texas
 K26KQ-D in Christmas Valley, Oregon
 K26NG-D in East Flagstaff, Arizona
 K26OJ-D in Tucumcari, New Mexico
 K27EJ-D in Colorado City, Arizona
 K27GM-D in Preston, Idaho
 K27JK-D in Glendale, Nevada
 K27KN-D in Alexandria, Minnesota
 K27OH-D in Lund & Preston, Nevada
 K28CS-D in Pahrump, Nevada
 K28GD-D in Heppner, etc., Oregon
 K28IH-D in Rainier, Oregon
 K28JM-D in Waimea, Hawaii
 K28JV-D in Hilo, Hawaii
 K28LO-D in Paisley, Oregon
 K28NO-D in Rogue River, Oregon
 K28PZ-D in Parlin, Colorado
 K29HB-D in Clovis, New Mexico
 K29JN-D in Gold Beach, Oregon
 K29LL-D in Phoenix/Talent, Oregon
 K29LO-D in Kingman, Arizona
 K29LY-D in Salmon, Idaho
 K29MD-D in O'Neill, Nebraska
 K29OE-D in Racine, Minnesota
 K30JS-D in Yreka, California
 K30RA-D in Racine, Minnesota
 K31EA-D in Littlefield, Arizona
 K31HZ-D in The Dalles, etc., Oregon
 K31IR-D in Grays River, Washington
 K31IZ-D in Naalehu, Hawaii
 K31NE-D in Williams, Arizona
 K31PT-D in Soda Springs, Idaho
 K32DW-D in Chloride, Arizona
 K32EH-D in Memphis, Texas
 K32GD-D in Guymon, Oklahoma
 K32OB-D in Panaca, Nevada
 K32OE-D in Alamogordo, New Mexico
 K33FF-D in Wallace, etc., Nebraska
 K33KE-D in Sargents, Colorado
 K33OW-D in Neligh, Nebraska
 K33PX-D in Clarendon, Texas
 K34LI-D in Jean, Nevada
 K34LS-D in Seneca, Oregon
 K34NQ-D in Memphis, Texas
 K34QC-D in Lewiston, Idaho
 K35II-D in South Point, Hawaii
 K36AE-D in Clarkdale, Arizona
 K36BA-D in Burns, Oregon
 K36FG-D in Hood River, etc., Oregon
 K36GU-D in Rockaway Beach, Oregon
 K36OF-D in Ursine, Nevada
 K36OZ-D in Hakalau, Hawaii
 K36PE-D in Peach Springs, Arizona
 K36PU-D in Pioche, Nevada
 K36PX-D in Caliente, Nevada
 KAKE in Wichita, Kansas
 KBIM-TV in Roswell, New Mexico
 KBRR in Thief River Falls, Minnesota
 KBSL-DT in Goodland, Kansas
 KENV-DT in Elko, Nevada
 KFAK-LD in Boise, Idaho
 KFDA-TV in Amarillo, Texas
 KFNE in Riverton, Wyoming
 KGBY-LD in Palm Springs, California
 KGTV in San Diego, California
 KIIO-LD in Los Angeles, California
 KISU-TV in Pocatello, Idaho
 KLFY-TV in Lafayette, Louisiana
 KLVX in Las Vegas, Nevada
 KMCA-LD in Redding, California
 KMEB in Wailuku, Hawaii
 KMOT in Minot, North Dakota
 KNPL-LD in North Platte, Nebraska
 KOLN in Lincoln, Nebraska
 KOLR in Springfield, Missouri
 KOPB-TV in Portland, Oregon
 KQAH-LD in Maltby, Washington
 KRDJ-LD in Lubbock, Texas
 KREY-TV in Montrose, Colorado
 KSAZ-TV in Phoenix, Arizona
 KSBS-CD in Denver, Colorado
 KSTF in Scottsbluff, Nebraska
 KTEN in Ada, Oklahoma
 KTSD-TV in Pierre, South Dakota
 KTTC in Rochester, Minnesota
 KTVE in El Dorado, Arkansas
 KTVL in Medford, Oregon
 KUHM-TV in Helena, Montana
 KULU-LD in Park City, Utah
 KULX-CD in Ogden, Utah
 KUVM-LD in Houston, Texas
 KWCM-TV in Appleton, Minnesota
 KWSU-TV in Pullman, Washington
 KWTX-TV in Waco, Texas
 KXNU-LD in Laredo, Texas
 KXTV in Sacramento, California
 KYVV-TV in Del Rio, Texas
 KZSD-LP in San Diego, California
 KZTV in Corpus Christi, Texas
 W03AM-D in Harrison, Maine
 W04BS-D in Bethel, Maine
 W05DD-D in St. Francis, Maine
 W14DY-D in Onancock, Virginia
 W34FC-D in La Crosse, Wisconsin
 WALA-TV in Mobile, Alabama
 WALB in Albany, Georgia
 WAVY-TV in Portsmouth, Virginia
 WBIQ in Birmingham, Alabama
 WBIR-TV in Knoxville, Tennessee
 WBNS-TV in Columbus, Ohio
 WBUP in Ishpeming, Michigan
 WCAU in Philadelphia, Pennsylvania
 WCBB in Augusta, Maine
 WDCO-CD in Woodstock, Virginia
 WDIO-DT in Duluth, Minnesota
 WFSF-LD in Key West, Florida
 WGEM-TV in Quincy, Illinois
 WGOM-LD in Panama City, Florida
 WHEC-TV in Rochester, New York
 WILM-LD in Wilmington, North Carolina
 WILX-TV in Onondaga, Michigan
 WIS in Columbia, South Carolina
 WJAR in Providence, Rhode Island
 WJXE-LD in Gainesville, Florida
 WKNO in Memphis, Tennessee
 WMEM-TV in Presque Isle, Maine
 WMVS in Milwaukee, Wisconsin
 WPLG in Miami, Florida
 WRUF-LD in Gainesville, Florida
 WSLS-TV in Roanoke, Virginia
 WSWF-LD in Orlando, Florida
 WTAJ-TV in Altoona, Pennsylvania
 WTEN in Albany, New York
 WTHI-TV in Terre Haute, Indiana
 WTSG-LD in Tifton, Georgia
 WTSP in St. Petersburg, Florida
 WVFX in Clarksburg, West Virginia
 WWCI-CD in Vero Beach, Florida
 WWUP-TV in Sault Ste. Marie, Michigan
 WYGN-LD in Berrien Springs, Michigan

The following stations, which are no longer licensed, formerly broadcast on virtual channel 10:
 K10LD-D in Dillingham, Alaska
 K10PL-D in Victoria, Texas
 K22JD-D in Madera Peak, Arizona
 K33CF-D in Wellington, Texas
 K33OS-D in Granite Falls, Minnesota
 K35CE-D in Canadian, Texas
 K36MA-D in Perryton, Texas
 K38KZ-D in Bovina, etc., Texas
 K38LK-D in Jacks Cabin, Colorado
 K41JT-D in Kilauea Military Camp, Hawaii
 K43ED-D in New Mobeetie, Texas
 K44CC-D in Gruver, Texas
 K46BY-D in Capulin, etc., New Mexico
 K48GI-D in Flagstaff, Arizona
 KBNB-LD in San Antonio, Texas
 KNEE-LD in Malaga, etc., Washington

References

10 virtual